Top seed Paolo Lorenzi won his 17th career ATP Challenger Tour title, beating Ivan Dodig 6–2, 6–4

Seeds

Draw

Finals

Top half

Bottom half

References
 Main Draw
  Qualifying Draw

2016 ATP Challenger Tour
2016 in Australian tennis